The 1885 FA Cup final was a football match between Blackburn Rovers and Queen's Park on 4 April 1885 at Kennington Oval in London. It was the fourteenth final of the world's oldest football competition, the Football Association Challenge Cup (known in the modern era as the FA Cup). Blackburn had won the Cup in the previous season while Queen's Park were competing in their second final with the previous final being previous year. Rovers won 2–0 in their second successive FA Cup Final victory, with the goals coming from Jimmy Forrest and James Brown.

Match details

 
 
 Played 4 April 1885
 Attendance 12,500
 Referee Major Francis Marindin

References
 Line-ups
 Match report at www.fa-cupfinals.co.uk

 

1885
1884–85 in English football
1884–85 in Scottish football
1885 sports events in London
Blackburn Rovers F.C. matches
Queen's Park F.C. matches
April 1885 sports events